Matheri Joseph Githitu (born 19 November 1982) is a Kenyan male badminton player.

Achievements

BWF International Challenge/Series
Mixed Doubles

 BWF International Challenge tournament
 BWF International Series tournament
 BWF Future Series tournament

References

External links
 

1982 births
Living people
People from Uasin Gishu County
Kenyan male badminton players
Badminton players at the 2014 Commonwealth Games
Commonwealth Games competitors for Kenya
Competitors at the 2011 All-Africa Games
Competitors at the 2015 African Games
African Games competitors for Kenya
21st-century Kenyan people